Sliedrecht was a Dutch tanker (5133 tonnes) that was sunk on 16 November 1939 by the . The Dutch government and English newspapers were critical of the Germans for sinking a neutral vessel en route to a neutral port in bad weather and making no provisions for the survivors. Sliedrecht had the word "Holland" and a large Dutch flag painted on each side.

Sinking 
Sliedrecht was en route to Norway with a full cargo of bulk petrol when she encountered a German submarine at 8:30pm on November 16.

Pieter Brons of Vlaardingen was one of five survivors of the event and gave his account to a newspaper reporter. He said that the ship was approximately 150 miles west of Ireland when a German submarine signaled her to heave-to. The sea was rough, so five crew set out for the German vessel in a small boat. The submarine commander inspected the ship's papers then decided to sink the vessel. He told the Dutchmen that there was no room for them aboard the German vessel and warned that if any distress signal was made Sliedrecht would be sunk immediately. They were given half an hour to abandon ship. The remaining 26 men aboard the Sliedrecht crammed into another life boat. The U-boat then fired a torpedo which struck and sank the Sliedrecht.

The morning after the sinking, the five survivors, who had their own small boat, saw no trace of the other lifeboat. They had a little bread and water, no compass and relied on the stars for navigation. The survivors remained at sea for seven days in an open boat before sighting land on the night of November 22–23. The next morning they hailed the trawler, Merisa after passing Barra Head Lighthouse. The trawler then delivered them to Oban where they were taken by ambulance to the West Highland cottage hospital.

26 of the crew of 31 were lost at sea.

References 

Oil tankers
World War II shipwrecks in the Atlantic Ocean
1924 ships
Ships sunk by German submarines in World War II
World War II merchant ships of the Netherlands
Maritime incidents in November 1939